Scleropogon is a genus of robber flies (insects in the family Asilidae). There are about 17 described species in Scleropogon.

Species
These 17 species belong to the genus Scleropogon:

 Scleropogon bradleyi (Bromley, 1937) i c g b
 Scleropogon cinerascens (Back, 1909) i c g
 Scleropogon coyote (Bromley, 1931) i c g
 Scleropogon dispar (Bromley, 1937) i c g
 Scleropogon duncani (Bromley, 1937) i b
 Scleropogon floridensis (Bromley, 1951) i c g
 Scleropogon haigi Wilcox, 1971 i c g b
 Scleropogon helvolus Loew, 1874 i c g b
 Scleropogon huachucanus (Hardy, 1942) i c g
 Scleropogon indistinctus (Bromley, 1937) i
 Scleropogon kelloggi (Wilcox, 137) i c g b
 Scleropogon neglectus (Bromley, 1931) i c g
 Scleropogon picticornis Loew, 1866 i c g b
 Scleropogon similis Jones, 1907 i c g
 Scleropogon subulatus (Wiedemann, 1828) i c g b
 Scleropogon texanus (Bromley, 1931) i b
 Scleropogon uhleri (Banks, 1920) i g

Data sources: i = ITIS, c = Catalogue of Life, g = GBIF, b = Bugguide.net

References

Further reading

External links

 

Asilidae genera
Articles created by Qbugbot